The Atlantic Coast Collegiate Hockey League (ACCHL) is a non-NCAA collegiate ice hockey league in the mid-atlantic and southeast regions of the United States. The Mission of the ACC Hockey League is to provide student-athletes an option to compete in organized intercollegiate ice hockey without the high expenses of NCAA level hockey.

The Men's and Women's Division II levels compete in the ACHA while the Men's Division III level competes in AAU. Mike "Sheriff" Walley is the current executive director of the league.

Current members

Men's Division II

Women's Division II

Men's Division III

League Expansion
2010: George Washington and Maryland join Men's Division II.
2012: Elon joins Men's Division II.
2013: Navy and Wake Forest join Men's Division II.
2015: James Madison, Saint Joseph's and UNC Charlotte join Men's Division II.
2018: West Virginia and UNC Wilmington join Men's Division II.
2019: Richmond joins Men's Division II.
2022: Penn State and Rowan join Men's Division II Premier; Denison and Princeton join Men's Division II Elite; East Carolina moves up to Men's Division II Elite from Men's Division III; Loyola Maryland joins Men's Division III Elite.
2023: Delaware, Maryland and Rider join Men's Division II Premier; Stevenson joins Men's Division II Elite and Men's Division III Premier; Loyola Maryland moves up from Men's Division III Elite to Premier; Charleston Southern joins Men's Division III Elite.

Tournament Championships
The ACCHL playoff tournament features all six teams qualifying from the M2 Premier Division as the winner is awarded the Admiral's Cup. The M2 Elite & M3 Premier Divisions have the top eight teams qualify. The M3 Elite Division has the top four teams qualify. The Women's Division features the top four teams qualifying as the winner is awarded the Commodore's Cup.

ACC Fall Tournament
From 2009 to 2020, NC State hosted the Stephen Russell Tournament at some point every season to commemorate the loss of their goaltender, Stephen Russell, who tragically drowned in a swimming accident at Jordan Lake. The team retired Russell's #20 in his honor.

Starting in the 2021–2022 season, the ACC began to host what is now the annual fall tournament for all M2 member teams for a three-game league weekend. The tournament takes place at The St. James in Springfield, VA. The league will typically invite two non-members from ACHA Men's Division II to come participate as well.

The current tournament features a conglomerate scoring system of winning periods (2 points per period), whole games (4 points = W, 2 points = OT/SOW, 1 point = OT/SOL, and 0 points = L), and points earned in a skills competition (varying by event). The totals are added for a final score. The Premier and Elite are each awarded a winner for the weekend.

Men's Division II Southeast Regionals
The ACHA hosts their regional tournaments towards the end of February. Four regions (Northeast, Southeast, Central and West) see teams ranked #3-14 compete in a single elimination, three-day weekend for two berths to the Men's Division II National Tournament. The top two teams in each regional automatically qualify.

2020: #9 Wake Forest defeated #12 The College of New Jersey in Overtime; defeated #4 NC State; lost to #3 Cincinnati.
2021: ACHA did not hold the regional tournament due to the shortened seasons caused by COVID-19.
2022: #3 NC State lost to #13 Pennsylvania / #14 North Carolina lost to #7 Indiana.
2023: #7 Penn State defeated #14 Rider; lost to #6 Ohio / #9 Rowan lost to #12 Louisville / #11 North Carolina defeated #10 NC State; defeated #5 Miami Ohio in Overtime; lost to #3 Kentucky.

Men's Division II National Tournament
The ACHA hosts the Men's Division II National Tournament every March, hosting 16 teams. Those teams are put into four separate pools with a team from each region. Winner of each pool advances to the Final Four.

2019: NC State (SE #4) finished 1–2 in Pool A; lost to Massachusetts (NE #1) 7–2, defeated Northern Colorado (West #2) 6-5 and lost to Trine (Central #3) 9–1.
2021: NC State (#2) finished 2–1 in Pool A; defeated Providence (#4) 6–4, defeated Davenport (#3) 5-3 and lost to Mary (#1) 5–1.

Men's Division III National Tournament
The AAU hosts its 32-team National Tournament every March. Teams are split into eight pools based on their national ranking. Winner of each pool advances to the Quarter-Finals. The overall winner is the AAU College Hockey National Champion.

2022: Christopher Newport (#16) won Pool A; lost to Central Florida (#17), defeated Salisbury (#32) and Tampa (#1) in Overtime; lost to Ramapo (#9) in the Quarter-Finals / Liberty (#12) finished 0–3 in Pool E; lost to Buffalo State (#21), College of Charleston and Babson (#5) / East Carolina (#18) finished 1–2 in Pool B; lost to St. Bonaventure (#15), Farmingdale State (#2) and defeated Penn State Harrisburg (#31) / College of Charleston (#28) went 1–2 in Pool E; lost to Babson (#5), defeated Liberty and lost to Buffalo State (#21).
2023: Liberty (#4) finished 0-2-1 in Pool G; tied Fordham (#26), lost to Alabama (#18) and South Carolina (#10) in Overtime / High Point (#32) finished 1-2 in Pool A; lost to St. Bonaventure (#1) and Georgia (#16) and defeated Massachusetts Maritime Academy (#24).

References

ACHA Division 2 conferences
Ice hockey in Maryland
Ice hockey in North Carolina
Ice hockey in Pennsylvania
Ice hockey in Virginia
Ice hockey in West Virginia
1995 establishments in the United States